During the 2001–02 English football season, Sheffield United competed in the Football League First Division.

Season summary
During the 2001–02 campaign, the Blades hoped to build on last season's top-half finish, but inconsistent results and too many draws cost them the opportunity to challenge for promotion via the play-offs. They finished in 13th place – a disappointing mid-table finish in Neil Warnock's second full season in charge.

Final league table

Results summary

Results by round

Results
Sheffield United's score comes first

Legend

Football League First Division

FA Cup

League Cup

Players

First-team squad
Squad at end of season

Left club during season

References

Notes

Sheffield United F.C. seasons
Sheffield United